Saima was a Swedish language weekly newspaper which was published in Turku, Finland. It was one of the first Swedish language newspapers in Finland. The paper adopted the libertarian theory of the press which would lead to its closure in 1846 soon after its start in 1844.

History and profile
Saima was founded by Johan Vilhelm Snellman, a Swedish-origin Finnish politician, in 1844. He was also the editor-in-chief of the paper which targeted educated people and was one of the earliest examples of the active and critical publications. Snellman published articles in the paper which appeared on a weekly basis and expressed his views on nationality, language and literature. He argued in an article in the second issue of Saima dated January 1844 that Finland did not have a national literature. The paper ceased publication in 1846 when it was banned by the authorities due to its liberal political and cultural stance which were considered to be a threat to the rule of Grand Duke of Finland, Nicholas I.

References

1844 establishments in Finland
1846 disestablishments in Finland
Banned newspapers
Censorship in Finland
Defunct newspapers published in Finland
Defunct weekly newspapers
Libertarian publications
Mass media in Turku
Publications established in 1844
Publications established in 1846
Swedish-language newspapers published in Finland
Weekly newspapers published in Finland